Metasia tiasalis is a species of moth of the family Crambidae.

Distribution
It was described from Sri Lanka, but has also been recorded from Australia (including Queensland).

Description
Adult has yellowish wings with brown speckles in between zigzag brown lines across them. It is a micro moths with a wingspan of 1.5 cm (0.39 inch).

References

Moths described in 1859
Metasia